Bellot may refer to:

 Bellot (surname)
 Bellot, Seine-et-Marne, a commune in France
 Bellot Strait, between Somerset Island and the Boothia Peninsula in Nunavut, Canada
 Bellot (crater), a lunar crater
 Bellot dit Lafontaine, Governor of Plaisance, Newfoundland from 1664 to 1667